Return of the Giant Slits is the second studio album by English punk band the Slits, released in 1981 by CBS Records on LP and cassette. In comparison with its widely acclaimed predecessor, Cut, released in 1979, it showcases a rhythmic, more experimental sound, inspired by afro-pop. The Slits would disband for the first time months after its release in early 1982.

The album was out of print for more than two decades until being reissued on CD by CBS Japan in 2004 and then by Blast First in 2007 with a bonus disc featuring alternate versions of songs from the album.

Track listing 
All songs written by the Slits. (Published by Virgin Music Ltd.)

Original album
"Earthbeat" (5:00)
"Or What It Is?" (4:24)
"Face Place" (4:23)
"Walk About" (4:43)
"Difficult Fun" (4:06)
"Animal Space/Spacier" (6:42)
"Improperly Dressed" (4:28)
"Life on Earth" (6:33)

CBS Japan issued the album on CD in 2004 with the Japanese version of "Earthbeat" as a bonus track.

2007 bonus disc
"Japanese Earthbeat (Daichi No Oto)" (5:01)
"German Earthbeat" (4:57)
"Dub Beat" (4:59)
"Face Place Dub" (4:24)
"Begin Again Rhythm" (5:45)
"Earthbeat" 12" Version (7:17)
"Earthbeat Extra" (3:51)
WORT FM USA Interview (12:00)

Personnel 
The Slits
 Ari Up - vocals, keyboards, percussion
 Viv Albertine - guitar, backing vocals
 Tessa Pollitt - bass guitar
 Bruce Smith - drums, percussion
with:
 Dave Lewis - other instruments ("for helping play")
 Steve Beresford - other instruments ("plays a lot on this record")
 Neneh Cherry - backing vocals
Technical
Nick Launay - engineer
Neville Brody - sleeve
Anton Corbijn - photography

References

1981 albums
The Slits albums
CBS Records albums